Trymalitis is a genus of moths belonging to the family Tortricidae.

Species
Trymalitis cataracta Meyrick, 1907 
Trymalitis climacias Meyrick, 1911 
Trymalitis escharia Clarke, 1976 
Trymalitis macarista Meyrick, 1934 
Trymalitis margarias Meyrick, 1905 
Trymalitis optima Meyrick, 1911 
Trymalitis scalifera Meyrick, 1912

References

 Meyrick, 1905, Descriptions of Indian Micro-Lepidoptera.I. - Journal of the Bombay natural History Society 16(4):580–619.
 , 1905, Descriptions of Indian Micro-Lepidoptera.I. - Journal of the Bombay natural History Society 16(4):580–619.
 , 2005, World Catalogue of Insects volume 5 Tortricidae.
 , 2010:  Tortricidae (Lepidoptera) from Ethiopia Journal of Entomological and Acarological Research Serie II, 42 (2): 47-79. Abstract: .

External links
tortricidae.com

Chlidanotini
Taxa named by Edward Meyrick
Tortricidae genera